Roger More may refer to:

 Rory O'Moore (Irish noble), aka Roger More
Roger More (MP)

See also
Roger Moore (disambiguation)